John Ernest Hammel (4 November 1940 in Wellington – 14 March 1983 in Wellington) was a New Zealand cricketer who played two first-class matches for the Wellington Firebirds in the Plunket Shield.

References 
 Profile at Cricinfo

1940 births
1983 deaths
New Zealand cricketers
Wellington cricketers
Cricketers from Wellington City